Abu Ubaydah (also spelled Abu Obeideh) is a Syrian village located in the Mahardah Subdistrict of the Mahardah District in Hama Governorate. According to the Syria Central Bureau of Statistics (CBS), Abu Ubaydah had a population of 745 in the 2004 census.

References 

Populated places in Mahardah District